The Qu River is a tributary of the Nanpan River (Pearl River) in Yunnan province, southwestern China. The Qu rises in southwestern Jiangchuan County and flows through the Yuxi City, Eshan Yi Autonomous County, Tonghai County, Jianshui County and Huaning County to reach its mouth at the Panxi Town of the Huaning County. The river has a length of 208 km and drains an area of 3,472 square km.

There are some distinct names for the river in different places:
Jiangchuan County: Jiuxi River
Yuxi City: Zhou River or Yuxi River
Eshan Yi Autonomous County: Ni River or Eshan River
Tonghai County: Liucun River
Jianshui County: Zhuji River
Huaning County: Huaxi River

Hydroelectric dams
The Mabozi Dam (马脖子电站) on the Qu River was constructed in 1977–1981. The station is located in Tonghai County near the border with Jianshui County, near the village called Caozi (槽子 or 漕子) in the Gaoda Dai and Yi Ethnic Township.

Notes

Tributaries of the Pearl River (China)
Rivers of Yunnan
Geography of Yuxi